The 2019–20 West Bank Premier League is the 17th season of the West Bank Premier League, the top football league in the West Bank of Palestine. The season started on 26 September 2019.

Teams

Team location

Pre-season
A total of 12 teams compete in the league. Markaz Balata are the defending champions. Shabab Al-Dhahiriya and Markaz Tulkarem were relegated from last season, and were replaced by promoted teams Ahli Qalqilyah and Al-Quwaat Al-Falistinia.

Stadia and location

League table

See also
2019–20 Gaza Strip Premier League
2019–20 Palestine Cup

References

West Bank Premier League seasons
1
West Bank